{{Infobox martial artist
| name            = Alessandro Riguccini
| image           = Alex New Wiki Interview.jpg
| image_size      = 
| caption         = Alessandro Riguccini WBC Silver World Champion
| birth_name      = Alessandro Riguccini
| other_names     = "Rognoso"
| nationality     = Italian
| birth_date      = 
| birth_place     = Firenze, Toscana, Italy
| fighting_out_of = Sansepolcro, ITA
| height          = 
| weight          = 
| weight_class    = Super featherweight Lightweight Super lightweight  Welterweight  Super welterweight  Middleweight 
| reach_in        = 
| style           = Boxing, Kickboxing, Sanda, Muay Thai, Taekwondo
| stance          = Orthodox
| team            = Zanfer Promotions (2012−present) X1 Boxing (2011–2012)  Balistic (1999–2010)
| trainer         = Jorge Barrera
| rank            = Black belt in Taekwondo Black belt in Jiu-Jitsu''
| years_active    = 1999–present
| kickbox_win     = 49
| kickbox_kowin   = 43
| kickbox_loss    = 3
| kickbox_koloss  = 
| kickbox_draw    = 
| kickbox_nc      = 
| box_win         = 28
| box_kowin       = 24
| box_decwin      = 4
| box_loss        = 
| box_koloss      = 
| box_decloss     = 
| box_draw        = 
| box_nc          = 
| am_label        = Amateur Kickboxing record
| am_win          = 96
| am_kowin        = 54
| am_subwin       = 
| am_loss         = 11
| am_koloss       = 5
| am_subloss      = 
| am_draw         = 4
| am_nc           =
| occupation      = Boxer
| university      =
| spouse          = 
| club            = 
| school          = Barrera Gym
| students        = 
| boxrec          = 595058
| sherdog         = 
| footnotes       = 
| updated         = 20 March 2022
}}Alessandro Riguccini (born 25 March 1988 in Florence, Italy) is an Italian boxer, kickboxer and engineer coached by Mexican trainer Fernando Fernandez.

Alessandro Riguccini is undefeated in professional boxing with a record of 28 wins with 24 knockouts, while winning WBC world silver welterweight title, the world lightweight title in the World Boxing Federation, the international lightweight title in the IBF and the FECARBOX super featherweight title in the WBC.

He held also the unified WKA and IKTA super lightweight K1 world titles.

On 11 July 2019 Riguccini gets a master's degree with 110 in computer engineering

Amateur career
Riguccini began kickboxing competitively at the age of 12, with early honours including two Federazione Italiana Wushu-Kung Fu (FIWuK) sanda titles. One of his notable early amateur fights was against Aaram Kuzmenkov of Russia for the CKA sanda amateur world title, where Alessandro lost by a single point. At the end of his amateur career he reported a record of 96 wins −11 losses − 4 draws in 111 matches.

Training in Cuba
After turning professional Riguccini moved to Cuba to train in boxing with the olympic star (gold Barcelona 1992 and gold Atlanta 1996) Héctor Vinent Cháron and all the Cuban olympic team.

Professional career
After returning from Cuba, Riguccini won almost all of his professional kickboxing matches, continually increasing his ranking among world kickboxing until he won the chance to vie for the world welterweight title.

Riguccini vs. Chiahou
In March 2010 at Sansepolcro (Italy) Riguccini faced the French champion Ibrahim Chiahou for the Wako Pro welterweight kickboxing world title. Riguccini started well but in the middle of the match, Chiahou connected with some low kicks putting him in serious trouble and won by points the title.

 Riguccini vs. Boumalek 
In November 2010, Riguccini moved up to the middleweight division to fight Rachid Boumalek at the Palamacchia of Livorno in Italy for the Wako Pro full contact world title. Riguccini delivered a 9th-round knock out to win the world title at the young age of 22.

 Riguccini vs. Ramirez Mendez 
On 2 July 2011 Riguccini fought Juan Manuel Ramirez in Torino for the Kombat League kickboxing super welterweight world title. Riguccini delivered a 2nd round knock out to win the world title and became at the same time kickboxing and full contact World champion. 

 Riguccini vs. Gogic 
Subsequently, 24 February 2012, Riguccini defeated Aleksandar Gogic of Serbia (who was silver medalist at the Wako world championships 2007 in Belgrade losing the final versus the Ukraine champion Maksym Glubochenko, Wako European 2008 championship gold medalist, bronze medal in 2010 and 2011 at the Wako European championships and Wako champion of the balkans, these titles obtained for Gogic), winning the Wako Pro lightweight world title (–62.200 kg). The match was settled by a unanimous decision on points to the fifth round.

Switch to Professional boxing
After only 13 amateur fights (7W−3L−3D) Riguccini decided to become a professional boxer under manager Conti Cavini and make his professional debut on 27 January 2012. He won by unanimous decision against Zoltan Janus Horvat.

Transfer to Mexico
After having terminated the contract with the colony of the manager "Conti Cavini" Alessandro moved to Mexico on 22 August 2012 to undertake his new journey of professional boxer, he established in Mexico City where he was represented by the Zanfer Promotions and was coached by Jorge Barrera (brother of Marco Antonio Barrera) at "Barrera Gym" along with others such as Moises Fuentes and Daniel Rosas. On 28 September 2012 he made his debut in Mexico beating by knockout in the second round Mexican fighter Eduardo Vargas. Then on 27 October he got a lightning victory, knocking down the veteran Mexican Leonardo Resendiz in 1:57 of the first round in his first eighth round match. After just 18 days after success against Leonardo Resendiz Riguccini got another win by KO at 1:31 minutes of the second round against Gabriel Lopez in a match scheduled for eight rounds and held at the Ex-Hacienda De Caltengo, Tepeji del Rio, Hidalgo, Mexico. On 5 December he again won by KO at 2:21 of the second round against the strong Hugo "El Poeta" Pacheco in a match of eight rounds, at the Municipal Explanada, Tepeji del Rio, Hidalgo, Mexico. After only 10 days, on 15 December, he fought again in a test match of four rounds against Orlando "Meteorito" Garcia at the Municipal Auditorium, San Juan Zitlaltepec winning all four rounds by a large margin, getting a unanimous decision.

WBC FECARBOX Title
On 28 December 2012 Alessandro Riguccini after only six professional matches faced the twenty-six-year-old Eugenio "Dinamita" Lopez in a 12-round match for the WBC FECARBOX title in the super featherweight division. The fight resolved with a fourth-round KO when Alessandro sent Lopez to the mat with a powerful right uppercut.

Future career in Mexico
On 12 January 2013, Riguccini was in the ring for a test match, knocking down Mexican Mauricio Becerril at 1:13 minutes in the first of the six rounds planned. On 29 January, he got a unanimous decision against the Mexican boxer Tomas Sierra in an 8-round fight at the Auditorio Municipal de Benito Juárez, Tepeji del Rio, Hidalgo. Then on 9 February he defeated the Mexican Neftali Perez by KO at 1:15 of the first round (of the 8 planned) at the Expo Feria, Hidalgo. On 19 February, he beat by disqualification in the eighth round (of the twelve planned), the young and strong Oscar Arenas who presented with a record of 23 wins (20 by KO) and only 5 losses proving to be a boxer of international level.

 Back in Italy and return to Kickboxing 
After returning to Italy, thanks to his wide experience boxing in Mexico he decided to try to become a world champion also in the specialty of the K1. On 5 October 2013 at the arena "Le Caselle" in Arezzo he took a first-round KO victory against the Romanian Cosmin "Genghis Khan" Zbranca and won the unified WKA and IKTA K1 world titles becoming world champion also in this discipline.

 World K1 Title defense 
On 20 December 2014 Riguccini retained his world K1 title against the Swiss Fabrizio Figarù in his hometown Sansepolcro.

  Second World K1 Title defense 
On 20 February 2016 Riguccini retained his world K1 title for the second time against the Kazakh Gennady Liviu Petre in San Giovanni Valdarno.

 Degree and returned to Mexico to professional boxing
On 16 June 2016 Riguccini graduated with 110 and honors in computer engineering and decided later, on 12 November 2016, to return to Mexico to resume his professional career in boxing in order to achieve important goals also in this sport. On 10 December 2016 he faced Mario Alberto Mondragon in a match of 10 rounds at Guanajuato and wins by knockout at minute 0:19 of the third round knocking him down for a total of four times during the match. On 21 January he defeated Adrian Reyes by KO at the minute 2:42 in the first round of the 8 programmed and remaining undefeated after 13 match.http://news.boxeringweb.net/notizie/ultime-notizie/49369-alessandro-riguccini-vince-per-ko-al-primo-round-in-messico.html After just two weeks back in the ring in the event "Jackie Nava vs Ana Maria Lozano" organized by Zanfer Promotion beating by KO in the first round (of the six planned) the Mexican Placido Perez Soria. After moving to Guasave (Sinaloa) returns to the ring on 18 March beating by KO effective in the first round (of the ten planned) Hugo Hernandez bringing his record to 15 wins and no losses with 11 KO. Thereafter on 1 April 2017 he beat by KO in the fourth round (of 10 planned) Carlos Lopez reaching the impressive score of 16 victories (of which 12 by KO) and no losses.

World Boxing Federation world title and IBF International title shot

On 22 April 2017 he had the opportunity to become also a boxing world champion. He faced expert Jesus Antonio Rios who came to the match with a record of 36 wins (of which 29 per KO) 9 defeats, 1 pair and a No-Contest against the 16 (all won, 12 per KO) of Riguccini. The match began with difficulties for Riguccini, which on the cards after two rounds was equal to two judges (19-19) and two points for the third judge (18-20). Towards the middle of the 3rd round, he succeeded with a right-back shot of Rios, which allowed him to score a series of shots at Rios's defeat, which forced the referee (Tony Weeks) to interrupt the match and deliver the two titles to Riguccini that won for technical KO.

Future career in Mexico
Less than a month away from the boxing lightweight world title, Riguccini decided to return to the ring in a 10 rounds match in which he faces the Mexican Jesus Valenzuela at the Guasave Score Bar in Sinaloa while knocking him out in the second round. On 2 June he returned to the ring in Sinaloa and beat Mexican boxer Christian Valverde for KO in the second round bringing his score to 19–0 with 15 KOs

Alessandro Riguccini vs Edgar Puerta
On 25 November 2017 he tackled former two times WBC world silver champion Edgar Puerta in a 10-round no-title match, winning by second-round knockout after being knocked out in the first round.

Alessandro Riguccini vs Bryan Romero Castillo
On 24 March 2018 he defeated the Mexican Bryan Romero Castillo, who appeared at the match with a record of 20 wins (15 Ko) and only 1 loss, with an effective KO at 1 minute and 21 seconds of the first round thus achieving a perfect record of 21 wins (17 Ko) and no defeat.

WBC World Silver welterweight title
On 27 October 2018 he won the welterweight world WBC silver title against the undefeated Andres Villaman (14-0, 10KOs) bringing his record to 22 wins (18 KOs) and no defeats and thus becoming world champion boxing and kickboxing in globally recognized federations (respectively WBC and Wako Pro).

WBC World Silver welterweight title defense
On 26 April 2019 he successfully defended the WBC Silver world welterweight title against the Mexican Ivan Alvarez Ruiz at the Tuscany Hall in Florence.

  
 Riguccini immediately strikes the liver with a straight left first and the Mexican heavily accuses. Riguccini realizes it and immediately closes it on the ropes unloading fast and powerful blows and making Alvarez count for three times that at the third count he is definitively stopped by TKO.

Second WBC World Silver welterweight title defense
On 26 October 2019 he successfully defended for the second time the WBC Silver welterweight world title he held against Venezuelan Juan Ruiz at the Plaza de Toros in Cancun, Mexico. The match begins so hard for Riguccini that finds in difficult to get a target while hitting the high Venezuelan. In the second round, however, he managed to hit Ruiz repeatedly, who suffered further body blows in the third round and did not respond to the bell of round number four. Later it will be ascertained that the withdrawal was due to the rupture of one of the ribs in the left side. On 21 November 2020, after more than a year of stoppage due to the global COVID-19 pandemic, he climbs back into the ring in a 10-round match for the second time against Iván Álvarez Ruiz, defeating him by KO at the beginning of the third round with a powerful right straight to the solar plexus.

Third WBC World Silver welterweight title defense
On 19 March 2021 he successfully defended his WBC Silver Welterweight title for the third time against former WBA Super Lightweight World Champion, the Venezuelan Johan Perez at the Salon SNTE 53 in Guasave (Sinaloa). The match begins in the first round with some phases of study and with Riguccini looking for the target above all to the figure of the opponent. At the start of the second round he accurately hits the opponent's liver with a left hook that forces him to retirement.
 About a year later he goes back to the ring against the expert Mexican Eleazar Valenzuela Carrillo (who had already been the opponent of illustrious boxers such as Miguel Berchelt, Jose Zepeda and Emanuel Navarrete) winning by KO in the third round by a series of blows to the body.He repeats the victory in February 2023, this time after 5 hard-fought rounds at the end of which Riguccini wins by KOT for a series of blows to the body.https://www.boxeringweb.net/index.php/notizie/ultime-notizie/42996-torna-in-azione-in-messico-mercoledi-lingeniere-alessandro-riguccini.html

Championships and accomplishments

Professional boxing
 WBC World Silver welterweight Champion (3 title defenses)
 World Boxing Federation World lightweight Champion
 IBF International lightweight Champion
 WBC FECARBOX super featherweight Champion.
 April 2017 World Boxing Federation "Boxer of the month"

Professional KickboxingKickboxing Wako Pro kickboxing World lightweight -62.2 kg Champion
 Wako Pro full contact World middleweight -71.8 kg champion
 WKA K1 World super lightweight -63.5 kg champion(2 Title Defences 2014,2016).
 Kombat League kickboxing World super welterweight -69.9 kg champion
 IKTA K1 World super lightweight -63.5 kg champion(2 Title Defences)
 WMMAF full contact International super welterweight -69.9 kg champion
 Wako Pro kickboxing World welterweight -66.8 kg championship runner upSandaCKA sanda 2006 Italian champion -70 kg
CKA sanda 2007 Italian champion -70 kg

Amateur KickboxingSandaCKA sanda 2005 super welterweight Italian junior championship  -65 kg
FIWuK sanda 2006 super welterweight Italian championship  -70 kg
FIWuK sanda 2007 super welterweight Italian championship  -70 kg
CKA sanda 2006 super welterweight World championship  -70 kg

Professional Boxing Record

| style="text-align:center;" colspan="8"|27 Wins (23 knockouts),  0 Defeat, 0 Draws|-  style="text-align:center; background:#e3e3e3;"
|  style="border-style:none none solid solid; "|Res.|  style="border-style:none none solid solid; "|Record|  style="border-style:none none solid solid; "|Opponent|  style="border-style:none none solid solid; "|Type|  style="border-style:none none solid solid; "|Rd., Time|  style="border-style:none none solid solid; "|Date|  style="border-style:none none solid solid; "|Location|  style="border-style:none none solid solid; "|Notes|- align=center
|Win
|28-0
|align=left| Eleazar Valenzuela Carrillo
|
|
|
|align=left|
|align=left|
|- align=center
|Win
|27-0
|align=left| Eleazar Valenzuela Carrillo
|
|
|
|align=left|
|align=left|
|- align=center
|Win
|26-0
|align=left| Johan Perez
|
|
|
|align=left|
|align=left|
|- align=center
|Win
|25-0
|align=left| Ivan Guadalupe Alvarez Ruiz
|
|
|
|align=left|
|align=left|
|- align=center
|Win
|24-0
|align=left| Juan Ruiz
|
|
|
|align=left|
|align=left|
|- align=center
|Win
|23-0
|align=left| Ivan Guadalupe Alvarez Ruiz
|
|
|
|align=left|
|align=left|
|- align=center
|Win
|22-0
|align=left| Jesús Andres Vega Villaman 
|
|
|
|align=left|
|align=left|
|- align=center
|Win
|21-0
|align=left| Bryan Romero Castillo
|
|
|
|align=left|
|align=left|
|- align=center
|Win
|20-0
|align=left| Edgar Puerta
|
|
|
|align=left|
|align=left|()
|- align=center
|Win
|19-0
|align=left| Christian Valverde
|
|
|
|align=left|
|align=left|
|- align=center
|Win
|18-0
|align=left| Jesus Valenzuela
|
|
|
|align=left|
|align=left|
|- align=center
|Win
|17-0
|align=left| Jesus Antonio Rios
|
|
|
|align=left|
|align=left|
|- align=center
|Win
|16-0
|align=left| Carlos Lopez Marmolejo
|
|
|
|align=left|
|align=left|
|- align=center
|Win
|15-0
|align=left| Hugo Hernandez
|
|
|
|align=left|
|align=left|
|- align=center
|Win
|14-0
|align=left| Placido Perez Soria
|
|
|
|align=left|
|align=left|
|- align=center
|Win
|13-0
|align=left| Adrian Reyes
|
|
|
|align=left|
|align=left|
|- align=center
|Win
|12-0
|align=left| Mario Alberto Mondragon
|
|
|
|align=left|
|align=left|
|- align=center
|Win
|11-0
|align=left| Oscar Arenas
|
|
|
|align=left|
|align=left|
|- align=center
|Win
|10-0
|align=left| Neftali Perez
|
|
|
|align=left|
|align=left|
|- align=center
|Win
|9-0
|align=left| Tomas Sierra
|
|
|
|align=left|
|align=left|
|- align=center
|Win
|8-0
|align=left| Mauricio Becerril
|
|
|
|align=left|
|align=left|
|- align=center
|Win
|7-0
|align=left| Eugenio Lopez
|
|
|
|align=left|
|align=left|
|- align=center
|Win
|6-0
|align=left| Orlando Garcia Guerrero
|
|
|
|align=left|
|align=left|
|- align=center
|Win
|5-0
|align=left| Hugo Pacheco
|
|
|
|align=left|
|align=left|
|- align=center
|Win
|4-0
|align=left| Gabriel Lopez
|
|
|
|align=left|
|align=left|
|- align=center
|Win
|3-0
|align=left| 
|
|
|
|align=left|
|align=left|
|- align=center
|Win
|2-0
|align=left| Eduardo Vargas
|
|
|
|align=left|
|align=left|
|- align=center
|Win
|1-0
|align=left| Zoltan Horvath
|
|
|
|align=left|
|align=left|
|- align=center

 Kickboxing titles bout record 

| style="text-align:center;" colspan="8"|49 Wins (43 knockouts),  3 Defeat, 0 Draws|-  style="text-align:center; background:#e3e3e3;"
|  style="border-style:none none solid solid; "|Res.|  style="border-style:none none solid solid; "|Record|  style="border-style:none none solid solid; "|Opponent|  style="border-style:none none solid solid; "|Type|  style="border-style:none none solid solid; "|Rd., Time|  style="border-style:none none solid solid; "|Date|  style="border-style:none none solid solid; "|Location|  style="border-style:none none solid solid; "|Notes|- align=center
|Win
|49-3
|align=left| Gennady Liviu Petre
|
|
|
|align=left|
|align=left|
|- align=center
|Win
|48-3
|align=left| Aslan Marabayev
|
|
|
|align=left|
|align=left|
|- align=center
|Win
|47-3
|align=left| Fabrizio Figarù
|
|
|
|align=left|
|align=left|
|- align=center
|Win
|46-3
|align=left| Cosmin Zbranca
|
|
|
|align=left|
|align=left|
|- align=center
|Win
|45-3
|align=left| Aleksandar Gogic
|
|
|
|align=left|
|align=left|
|- align=center
|Win
|44-3
|align=left| Alin Butnariuc
|
|
|
|align=left|
|align=left|
|- align=center
|Win
|43-3
|align=left| Juan Manuel Ramirez
|
|
|
|align=left|
|align=left|
|- align=center
|Win
|42-3
|align=left| Rachid Boumalek
|
|
|
|align=left|
|align=left|
|- align=center
|Win
|41-3
|align=left| Marco Ghibaudo
|
|
|
|align=left|
|align=left|
|- align=center
|Loss
|40-3
|align=left| Ibrahim Chiahou
|
|
|
|align=left|
|align=left|

Professional Mixed Martial Arts record

| style="text-align:center;" colspan="8"|2 Wins (1 knockout),  0 Defeat, 0 Draws|-  style="text-align:center; background:#e3e3e3;"
|  style="border-style:none none solid solid; "|Res.|  style="border-style:none none solid solid; "|Record|  style="border-style:none none solid solid; "|Opponent|  style="border-style:none none solid solid; "|Type|  style="border-style:none none solid solid; "|Rd., Time|  style="border-style:none none solid solid; "|Date|  style="border-style:none none solid solid; "|Location|  style="border-style:none none solid solid; "|Notes|- align=center
|Win
|2-0
|align=left| Emanuele Valentini
|
|
|
|align=left|
|align=left|
|- align=center
|Win
|1-0
|align=left| Daniel Bellistri
|
|
|
|align=left|
|align=left|
|- align=center

Amateur Mixed Martial Arts record

| style="text-align:center;" colspan="8"|1 Win (1 knockout),  0 Defeat, 0 Draws|-  style="text-align:center; background:#e3e3e3;"
|  style="border-style:none none solid solid; "|Res.|  style="border-style:none none solid solid; "|Record|  style="border-style:none none solid solid; "|Opponent|  style="border-style:none none solid solid; "|Type|  style="border-style:none none solid solid; "|Rd., Time|  style="border-style:none none solid solid; "|Date|  style="border-style:none none solid solid; "|Location|  style="border-style:none none solid solid; "|Notes'''
|- align=center
|Win
|1-0
|align=left| Andrei Ruelle
|
|
|
|align=left|
|align=left|
|- align=center

References

1988 births
Living people
Italian male kickboxers
Lightweight kickboxers
Welterweight kickboxers
Middleweight kickboxers
Italian Muay Thai practitioners
Italian male taekwondo practitioners
People from Sansepolcro
Italian bricklayers
Italian male boxers
Italian sanshou practitioners
Italian jujutsuka
Italian male mixed martial artists
Mixed martial artists utilizing sanshou
Mixed martial artists utilizing Muay Thai
Mixed martial artists utilizing taekwondo
Mixed martial artists utilizing boxing
Mixed martial artists utilizing jujutsu
Sportspeople from Florence